Caseros Station is a station on Line H of the Buenos Aires Underground. The station was opened on 18 October 2007, as the southern terminus of the inaugural section of the line, between Once - 30 de Diciembre and Caseros. It remained the line's southern terminus until the opening of Parque Patricios Station on 4 October 2011.

References

External links

Buenos Aires Underground stations
Railway stations opened in 2007
2007 establishments in Argentina